In horticulture, bedding is temporary planting of fast-growing plants into flower beds to create colourful displays, during spring, summer or winter.  Plants used for bedding are generally annuals, biennials or tender perennials; succulents are gaining in popularity.

Some bedding plants are also referred to as "patio plants" because they are widely used in pots and other containers positioned on patios, terraces, decking and other areas around houses. Larger tender "conservatory plants" may also be moved out from greenhouses or conservatories and planted out in borders (or stood in their pots in sheltered positions) for the warmer months, then returned to shelter for the winter.

The modern bedding plant industry breeds and produces plants with a neat, dwarf habit, which flower uniformly and reliably. They are bred primarily for use in large-scale bedding schemes where uniformity and predictability is of paramount importance, but this is often achieved by losing the plants' individual character, and has been criticised by such notable plantsmen as the late Christopher Lloyd, who championed an informal style of bedding.

Bedding plants
There exists a huge range of plants specifically grown to produce a period of flower colour throughout the spring and summer, and (usually) discarded after flowering.  They may conveniently be divided into four groups:
Hardy annuals sown directly into the ground early in the season (poppy, stock, sunflower, clarkia, godetia, eschscholzia, nigella, dianthus)
Tender annual or perennial plants treated as half-hardy annuals – sown under glass in late winter in heat, or purchased as young plants, and hardened-off outdoors when all danger of frost has passed (begonia, lobelia, petunia, argyranthemum, chrysanthemum, pelargonium, nicotiana, cosmos, fuchsia)
Hardy biennial plants, or perennials treated as biennial, sown in one year to flower the next, and discarded after flowering (antirrhinum, polyanthus, wallflower, daisy, foxglove, some dianthus, some poppies, campanula, delphinium, aubrieta, aquilegia, cornflower, pansies)
Corms, rhizomes, bulbs and tubers, planted each year and lifted after the plant has died down and stored in winter, or discarded (tulip, narcissus, hyacinth, gladiolus, dahlia, canna)

Types of bedding
Formal bedding, as seen in parks and large gardens, where whole flower beds are replanted two or three times a year, is a costly and labour-intensive process. Towns and cities are encouraged to produce impressive displays by campaigns such as "Britain in bloom".

Spring bedding
Plants used for spring bedding are often biennials (sown one year to flower the next), or hardy, but short-lived, perennials. Spring-flowering bulbs such as tulips are often used, typically with forget-me-nots, wallflowers, winter pansies and polyanthus.

Summer bedding

Plants used for summer bedding are generally annuals or tender perennials. They become available (often as what are referred to as "plug plants") in nurseries and garden centres during spring, to be gradually "hardened off" (acclimatised to outdoor conditions) by the purchaser and finally planted out around the time that the last frosts are expected. Experienced gardeners keep an eye on the weather forecasts at that time of year and are on standby to protect their bedding displays overnight with horticultural fleece (or the older alternatives of net curtains or newspaper) if frost threatens.

Carpet bedding

Carpet bedding employs two or more contrasting plant cultivars with a neat, dwarf habit and distinct colouring (of flower or foliage) to create geometric displays. It is often used to form such things as lettering, logos or trademarks, coats of arms, or floral clocks. Suitable plants are rosette-forming succulents such as Echeveria or fairly slow-growing or mat-forming foliage plants, such as coloured-leaved Alternanthera cultivars, which are tolerant of clipping; such plants may also be used in three-dimensional sculptural forms or pseudo-topiary.

William Morris was an early critic, writing in 1882 that it was: "an aberration of the human mind ... when I think of it even when I am quite alone I blush with shame at the thought".

Winter bedding
Planted in autumn to give a display until early spring, the plants used for winter bedding are mainly hardy perennials. As it has to be planted at the same time of year as spring bedding does, winter bedding tends to be less commonly seen, except in containers such as windowboxes. Some are short-lived and will be discarded after their first display; others may be used as a source of cuttings for the next year. Winter-hardy ornamental vegetables such as cultivars of kale and cabbage with coloured or variegated foliage are increasingly common. Primula cultivars (polyanthus and primroses) are commonly used, as are winter-flowering heathers and Viola ×wittrockiana, winter pansies. Variegated evergreens such as cultivars of Vinca minor (lesser periwinkle), Euonymus fortunei and Hedera helix (ivies) are also popular.

References

Horticulture